The canton of Vaires-sur-Marne is a French former administrative division, located in the arrondissement of Torcy, in the Seine-et-Marne département (Île-de-France région). It was disbanded following the French canton reorganisation which came into effect in March 2015.

Demographics

Composition 
The canton of Vaires-sur-Marne was composed of 2 communes, and part of a third commune:
Brou-sur-Chantereine
Chelles (partly)
Vaires-sur-Marne

See also
Cantons of the Seine-et-Marne department
Communes of the Seine-et-Marne department

References

Vaires sur Marne
2015 disestablishments in France
States and territories disestablished in 2015